Misleydis Lazo (born 7 September 1981) is a Cuban sprinter. She competed in the women's 4 × 100 metres relay at the 2004 Summer Olympics.

References

1981 births
Living people
Athletes (track and field) at the 2004 Summer Olympics
Cuban female sprinters
Olympic athletes of Cuba
Place of birth missing (living people)
Olympic female sprinters